Koh-Lanta: Le Combat des Héros is the 22nd season and the 5th All-Star season of the French version of Survivor, Koh-Lanta. This season, like last season, takes place in Fiji on the Yasawa Islands, and airs on TF1. The main twist this season is that after a contestant is voted out, they are sent to L'île de l'Exil where they will face against other eliminated contestants for a chance to return to the game. This is the first season in which contestants who are eliminated in circumstances that do not involve being voted off are not replaced by the last eliminated contestant. The season premiered on 16 March 2018 and concluded on 25 May 2018 where Clémence Castel was crowned as the Sole Survivor in a close 5-4 jury vote against Pascal Salviani becoming the first two-time winner of Koh-Lanta.

Contestants

Futures appearances  
Clémentine Jullien, Candice Boisson and Clémence Castel returned to compete in Koh-Lanta: La Légende.

Challenges

Voting history

References

External links

Koh-Lanta seasons
2018 French television seasons
Television shows filmed in Fiji